Nikola Stipić (born 18 December 1937) is a former Serbian footballer.

Club career
He started to play for Red Star Belgrade still in the youth teams, debuting for the first team in the 1956/57 season. He had an excellent start becoming known for his speed, great technical skills and dribbling, but his career suddenly came to an end because of a heavy knee injury having only 26 years old.

International career
He made one appearance for Yugoslavia, coming on as a second half substitute for Vladimir Lukarić in a September 1962 friendly match against Ethiopia.

Post-playing career
Afterward he became a journalist of the Belgrade-based daily Večernje novosti.

References

External links

 Career story at Reprezentacija.rs.

1937 births
Living people
People from Bihać
Serbs of Bosnia and Herzegovina
Association football midfielders
Yugoslav footballers
Yugoslavia international footballers
1962 FIFA World Cup players
Red Star Belgrade footballers
Yugoslav First League players
Yugoslav journalists